was a Japanese track and field athlete. He competed in the men's high jump at the 1936 Summer Olympics.

References

External links
 

1915 births
Year of death missing
Place of birth missing
Japanese male high jumpers
Japanese male pole vaulters
Olympic male high jumpers
Olympic athletes of Japan
Athletes (track and field) at the 1936 Summer Olympics
Japan Championships in Athletics winners